During the 1984–85 English football season, Leicester City F.C. competed in the Football League First Division.

League table

Notes

Leicester City F.C. seasons
Leicester City